Fersit  is a hamlet  close to Tulloch railway station in Lochaber, Scottish Highlands and is in the Highland council area.

The River Treig, which drains into Loch Treig runs past Fersit.

Fersit had a small station on the West Highland Line, known as Fersit Halt. This was a temporary structure, used during the construction of the Lochaber hydro-electric scheme, and closed in 1935. The Lochaber Narrow Gauge Railway, a railway line built for the construction of the hydro scheme, also passed by Fersit.

Climate
Fersit has a local Met Office weather station, Tulloch Bridge. Overall it is generally colder and wetter than the UK average but with cold winters and mild summers.

References

Populated places in Lochaber